Leo the Lion is a 2005 computer-animated adventure film directed by Mario Cambi, written by Mario Cambi and Pierstefano Marangoni and starring Daniel Amerman, John Cygan and Matthew Mercer. The film gained notoriety for its poor quality and scathing reception by viewers, and has occasionally been named as one of the worst animated films ever made.

Plot 
Leo, who is a vegetarian, struggles to fit in his pride. While hunting for zebras with the other lions, Leo's mother dies by falling over a waterfall on the day he goes for his first hunt. After that traumatic experience, he develops a fear of water. Being bullied by the other lions, he leaves them and starts living in a tree. One day he meets a female elephant, Savannah and helps her deliver her twin baby elephants. It is later mentioned that her husband, Eli Phant, was killed by humans. However, it is revealed that he was actually knocked out by Maximus Elefante and is taken to a zoo. After the delivery, the little calves consider him to be their father and follow him constantly. When Leo decides to find the "Heart of the Jungle", a place Leo's mother once told him about before she died, he is accompanied by the elephants and Uncle Lope, a gazelle. They meet many other young animals on their quest, such as a young zebra. After having lots of adventures, they eventually find the Heart of the Jungle, which is also the home of a female chameleon. The latter allows to two orphans, a leopard, and a monkey, to stay in her place. On the way back, Maximus, who was following the company, finds the two baby elephants, kidnaps them and later claims he saved them from Leo, the "evil" lion. Maximus then tries to marry Savannah, but Leo turns up at the last moment and stops the wedding. Suddenly, a helicopter appears, shoots Maximus and is defeated. The movie finishes by showing Leo talking to his children, two elephant/lion hybrids.

Cast 
 Daniel Amerman as Leo the Lion
 John Cygan as Uncle Lope
 Matthew Mercer as Maximus Elefante
 Amanda Allan as Savannah
 Porter Hansen as Shaman
 Debi Derryberry as Baby Elephants
 Mari Devon as Leo's Mom
 Eileen Galindo as Goo Roo / Beatrice
 Michael Sorich as Eli Phant / Hyena #1
 Cristina Pucelli as Nanou / Baby Monkey #2
 Grant George as Crocodiles / Hyena #2
 Fabiana Arrastia as Zebra Mom
 Bailey Gambertoglio as Spots / Lion Cub
 Cole Sand as Ebony
 Terrence Stone as Snake / Hyena #3 / Vulture #1

References

External links
 
 

2005 films
Spanish-language Netflix original films
English-language Netflix original films
Italian-language Netflix original films
The Weinstein Company films
The Weinstein Company animated films
2000s American films